Jeffrey Wilson may refer to:

 Jeffrey A. Wilson, professor of geological sciences
 Jeffrey T. Wilson, chief executive officer of Imperial Petroleum

See also
 Jeff Wilson (disambiguation)
Geoff Wilson (disambiguation)